Philip Rosenberg (born January 15, 1935) is an American production designer and art director. He has won an Academy Award and was nominated for another in the category Best Art Direction.

Selected filmography
Rosenberg has won an Academy Award for Best Art Direction and has been nominated for another:
Won
 All That Jazz (1979)
Nominated
 The Wiz (1978)

Rosenberg wrote the screenplay for Murder Between Friends (1994) and was congratulated by Variety for the subtlety of his script.

References

External links
 
 

1935 births
Living people
American production designers
American art directors
Best Art Direction Academy Award winners
People from Brooklyn